The 43rd Annual TV Week Logie Awards was held on Sunday 22 April 2001 at the Crown Palladium in Melbourne, and broadcast on the Nine Network. The ceremony was hosted by Shaun Micallef, and guests included Michael Crawford and Christopher Ellison.

Winners and nominees
In the tables below, winners are listed first and highlighted in bold.

Gold Logie

Acting/Presenting

Most Popular Programs

Most Outstanding Programs

Performers
Ricky Martin – "She Bangs" and "Loaded"
Human Nature – A medley
Vanessa Amorosi – "Shine"

Hall of Fame
After several years on Australian television, Ruth Cracknell became the 18th inductee into the TV Week Logies Hall of Fame.

References

External links
 

2001
2001 television awards
2001 in Australian television
2001 awards in Australia